Whitesboro is an unincorporated community and census-designated place (CDP) located within Middle Township in Cape May County, New Jersey, United States. Until the 2000 Census the area had been part of the Whitesboro-Burleigh CDP, which was split in 2010 into separate CDPs for Burleigh and Whitesboro. As of the 2010 United States Census, the CDP's population was 2,205. Whitesboro was founded as a planned residential community for African Americans and has the majority of the township's black population.

History
Whitesboro was founded about 1901 by the Equitable Industrial Association, which had prominent black American investors including Paul Laurence Dunbar, the educator Booker T. Washington and George Henry White, the leading investor and namesake.  He was an attorney who had moved to Philadelphia after serving as the last black Republican congressman representing North Carolina's 2nd congressional district. White and his fellow entrepreneurs wanted to create a self-reliant community for blacks without the discrimination faced by black residents of the southern states. Shares in the planned community were sold to African Americans from North and South Carolina and Virginia.

In 2006, the Johnson Family Historical Trust discovered the value of its original deed to Whitesboro property from the George H. White Realty Company. It has been called one of "America's Untold Treasures" by appraiser Phillip Merrill. The Johnson Family Historical Trust holds rare items important to Whitesboro, such as a 1936 radio formerly owned by James L. Johnson, a nationally recognized ham radio operator. His radios are of interest to Whitesboro and national history in technology.

There are more than 50 known and appraised artifacts from the original investors of the town that will be featured in Whitesboro in upcoming years. A dig for national history is planned to uncover more artifacts at various historical sites in Whitesboro, hosted by the Johnson Family Historical Trust.

Geography
According to the United States Census Bureau, the CDP had a total area of 3.632 square miles (9.406 km2), including 3.614 square miles (9.360 km2) of land and 0.018 square miles (0.047 km2) of water (0.50%).

Demographics

Census 2010

Education
It is within the Middle Township School District which operates Middle Township High School.

Countywide schools include Cape May County Technical High School and Cape May County Special Services School District.

In the era of de jure educational segregation in the United States, a school for black children was maintained in Whitesboro for grades 1-8.

Notable people
People who were born in, residents of, or otherwise closely associated with Whitesboro include:
 Stedman Graham (born 1951), a 1,000-point scorer for the Middle Township High School boys varsity basketball team; he is an educator, author, businessman, and speaker who is the longtime partner of media mogul Oprah Winfrey.

References

External links

 The Cape May County Gazette, community newspaper
 The Beachcomber

Census-designated places in Cape May County, New Jersey
Middle Township, New Jersey
African-American history of New Jersey